François Cautaerts (1810 in Brussels – 1881 in Brussels) was a Belgian art painter from the 19th century. He made several paintings with a historical and religious character.

Some paintings of François Cautaerts:
The pipe smoker (museum Bruges)
Christ and the pharisees
The theft of Orion by Aurora
The saint family
Milton and his lost paradise
The bride
Johanna Gray
The card players
The lively man

References

1810 births
1881 deaths
Artists from Brussels
19th-century Belgian painters
19th-century Belgian male artists